The 1971 Tuscania earthquake occurred on February 6 in Italy. It had an epicenter located halfway between Tuscania and Arlena di Castro, about 20 km west of Viterbo. It had a body wave magnitude of 4.6.

Damage and casualties
Despite being a moderately-sized earthquake, it caused major destruction. Between 24 and 33 people were killed, 150 were injured and about 5,000 were left homeless. Forty homes were destroyed and 1,678 were damaged, amounting to a total loss of $41 million (1971 rate). It was reported that the medieval section of Tuscania, a city of 8,000 inhabitants, was practically leveled, and 60 percent of the city's buildings were destroyed. Among those structures sustaining serious damage was the 8th century St. Peter's Church and the 12th century Basilica of St. Mary Major, both recently restored. The heavy damage sustained was due to the shallow depth of the earthquake and poorly constructed buildings.

See also

List of earthquakes in 1971
List of earthquakes in Italy

References

External links 

 Page about this earthquake in the CFTI5MED catalogue of strong earthquakes in Italy and in the Mediterranean area, Guidoboni et al. 2019, Istituto Nazionale di Geofisica e Vulcanologia (INGV)
 

Earthquakes in Italy
1971 earthquakes
1971 in Italy
February 1971 events in Europe
1971 disasters in Italy